Eschbronn is a municipality in the district of Rottweil, in Baden-Württemberg, Germany.

History and name
A previous, unsuccessful attempt at a merger was attempted by the townships in 1939. For the 1972 merger, the equality of the townships was emphasized by the choosing of a new name, Eschbronn.

Locherhof
Locherhof was first mentioned in 1326 as "Affolterunbach", an apple orchard owned by the Imperial Abbey of Rottenmünster, in a legal dispute with another Rottenmünster's properties. The township was conferred in 1483 Hans Christlin von Büdingen, a local nobleman, but remained a property of the abbey. This document was the first to use the name "Locherhof" in reference to the town. Locherhof was divided into two properties, Upper and Lower Locherhof, in the mid-16th century. Both expanded dramatically in the 18th century, though the separation caused much commercial headache. In 1802-03, as a result of German mediatization, Rottenmünster was secularized and all its properties were awarded to the Electorate, later Kingdom, of Württemberg. Locherhof was assigned first to a local district based at Rottenmünster, but in 1806 became an independent municipality.

Mariazell
Mariazell was established by Reichenau Abbey around 1000, but was first mentioned in historical documents in the 1275 Cella Mariae tithe book. The town was devastated by local warfare in 1444 and that time was a possession of the Lordship of Schramberg, itself part of the Habsburg realm of Further Austria.

Mariazell also became a possession of the Kingdom of Württemberg in 1806. Until 1839, the present-day municipality of Hardt was a borough of Mariazell.

Geography

Politics
Eschbronn has two boroughs (Ortsteile): Locherhof and Marizell.

Coat of arms
Eschbronn's municipal coat of arms displays ash tree branch with seven leaves, in green above a blue, invected line, and upon a field of white. This pattern mainly refers to the etymology of "Eschbronn". It was awarded with a municipal flag by the Rottweil district office in 1990.

References

External links
  (in German)

Rottweil (district)